Gerd-Volker Schock (born 8 April 1950) is a German football coach and a former player.

He played 57 matches in the Bundesliga and scored 23 goals. Only seven players scored more goals in the history of the 2. Bundesliga.

References

External links

1950 births
Living people
People from Ostholstein
Footballers from Schleswig-Holstein
German football managers
German footballers
Bundesliga players
2. Bundesliga players
VfB Lübeck players
VfL Osnabrück players
Arminia Bielefeld players
Hamburger SV managers
Bundesliga managers
2. Bundesliga managers
VfL Osnabrück managers
Holstein Kiel managers
Association football forwards
20th-century German people